Rosa Alicia Clemente (born April 18, 1972) is an American community organizer, independent journalist, and hip-hop activist. She was the vice presidential running mate of Green Party Presidential candidate Cynthia McKinney in the 2008 U.S. Presidential election.

Early life and education
Clemente was born and raised in South Bronx, New York. She is a graduate of the University of Albany and Cornell University.  She is currently a doctoral student in the W.E.B. Du Bois Department of Afro-American Studies of University of Massachusetts Amherst.

Clemente's academic work has focused on research of national liberation struggles within the United States, with a specific focus on the Young Lords Party and the Black Liberation Army. While a student at SUNY Albany, she was President of the Albany State University Black Alliance (ASUBA) and Director of Multicultural Affairs for the Student Association. At Cornell she was a founding member of La Voz Boriken, a social/political organization dedicated to supporting Puerto Rican political prisoners and the independence of Puerto Rico.

Journalism
Clemente has written for Clamor Magazine, The Ave. magazine,  The Black World Today, The Final Call and numerous websites. She has been the subject of articles in the Village Voice, The New York Times, Urban Latino and The Source magazines. She has appeared on CNN, MSNBC, C-SPAN, Democracy Now! and Street Soldiers. In 2001, she was a youth representative at the United Nations World Conference against Xenophobia, Racism and Related Intolerance in South Africa and in 2002 was named by Red Eye Magazine as one of the top 50 Hip Hop Activists to look out for.

Activism
In 1995, she developed Know Thy Self Productions (KTSP), a full-service speakers bureau, production company and media consulting service. 

She attended the 75th Golden Globe Awards in 2018 as a guest of Susan Sarandon.

Vice presidential campaign
 
In July 2008, Clemente was named the running mate of former Congresswoman Cynthia McKinney. Three days later, on July 12, she was confirmed as the vice presidential nominee of the Green Party of the United States at their annual convention. A month later, Clemente and McKinney appeared at a number of events in Denver, Colorado, which was the site of the 2008 Democratic National Convention. On August 27, Rosa Clemente spoke at an "Open The Debates" rally organized by the Ralph Nader/Matt Gonzalez presidential campaign.

On Election Day, McKinney/Clemente received 161,797 votes (0.12% of the popular vote).

Personal life
Clemente was raised Catholic and identifies as an Afro-Latina Puerto Rican.

References

External links 
 Rosa Clemente's Website
 "Where We Live" Radio Program Co-Hosted by Rosa Clemente on WBAI 99.5 FM 8–9 pm Thursdays in New York City.
 Feminist We Love:Rosa Clemente
 Hip-hop, Money, Youth & Liberation: A Talk with Rosa Clemente
 Rosa Clemente and Matt Gonzalez respond to Biden-Palin Debate Response to only televised 2008 U.S. Vice-Presidential Debate, Democracy Now! October 3, 2008.

1972 births
21st-century American politicians
American anti-war activists
American democracy activists
American politicians of Puerto Rican descent
American women journalists
American community activists
Cornell University alumni
Cynthia McKinney
Female candidates for Vice President of the United States
Green Party of the United States politicians
Green Party of the United States vice presidential nominees
Hip hop activists
Living people
People from the Bronx
2008 United States vice-presidential candidates
University at Albany, SUNY alumni
Activists from New York (state)
Former Roman Catholics
Puerto Rican people of African descent